Cristoforo may refer to:

See also 
 Cristoforo Colombo (disambiguation)
 Cristian (disambiguation)
 San Cristoforo (disambiguation)
 Violet Kazue de Cristoforo

Masculine given names